Epipagis disparilis is a moth in the family Crambidae. It is found in Mexico and Arizona.

There is a heavy and continuous antemedial line on the hindwings. The forewings in both sexes have the reniform spot joined to the tornal patch by a definite oblique bar, which appears to form the transverse segment of the postmedial line.

References

Moths described in 1910
Spilomelinae